Cowcross Street is a street in London. It runs east–west, from St John Street in the east, to Farringdon Road in the west.

Farringdon Station is on the corner of Cowcross Street and Turnmill Street. The Castle is a public house opposite Farringdon Station. Eliza, the wife of Sir John Soane, was born in an earlier building with the same name and purpose on the same site in 1760.

The Hope is a late 19th-century Grade II listed public house at 94 Cowcross Street.

The Public Monuments and Sculpture Association (PMSA) is based at 70 Cowcross Street.

London Lesbian and Gay Centre, London's first non-commercial lesbian and gay community centre, was located at 67-69 Cowcross Street from 1985 to 1991. These offices are now used by Addaction, the charity founded in 1967 that works with people who are addicted to drugs and alcohol.

References

Streets in the London Borough of Islington
Farringdon, London